Hendrikus or Hendricus is a Latinized form of the Dutch masculine given name Hendrik ("Henry"). Most people with this name use a short form in daily life, like Han, Hein, Hendrik, Henk, Hennie, Henny, Henri, Henry, Rijk, and Rik. People with the name include:

Hendrikus Berkhof (1914–1995), Dutch theologian
Hendrikus Johannes "Henk" Bosveld (1941–1998), Dutch footballer
Hendricus Petrus "Henk" Bremmer (1871–1956), Dutch painter, art critic, art teacher, collector and art dealer
Hendrikus Frederikus "Henk" Breuker (1914–2003), Dutch potter and ceramist
Hendrikus "Henk" Chabot (1894–1949), Dutch painter and sculptor
Hendrikus "Hendrik" Colijn (1869–1944), Dutch CEO of Royal Dutch Shell and Prime Minister of the Netherlands
Hendrikus "Hennie" Dompeling (born 1966), Dutch sport shooter
Hendrikus "Henk" Fraser (born 1966), Dutch football player and manager
Hendrikus "Hennie" Hollink (born 1931), Dutch football player and manager
Hendrikus A.L. "Henk" van Hoof (born 1947), Dutch VVD politician and State Secretary
Hendrikus Josephus "Henny" Huisman (born 1951), Dutch television presenter 
Hendrikus Alexander "Henk" Janssen (1890–1969), Dutch tug of war competitor
Hendrikus Zacharias "Hennie" Keetelaar (1927–2002), Dutch water polo player
Hendrikus Andreas "Hennie" Kuiper (born 1949), Dutch road racing cyclist
Hendrikus Albertus Lorentz (1871–1944), Dutch explorer in New Guinea and diplomat in South Africa
Hendricus Malinus (Hendrick van den Broeck; c.1530–1597), Flemish painter active in Italy
Hendricus Adriaan "Henk" Pellikaan (1910–1999), Dutch footballer 
Hendrikus A. "Henk" Plenter (1913–1997), Dutch footballer
Hendrikus "Henk" Poort (born 1956), Dutch opera singer and musical performer
Hendrikus van de Sande Bakhuyzen (1795–1860), Dutch landscape painter and art teacher
Hendrikus J.E. "Henk" Schiffmacher (born 1952), Dutch tattoo artist
Hendricus J.F.M. "Henk" Sneevliet (1883–1942), Dutch Communist Resistance member executed by the Nazi occupiers
Hendrikus J.M. "Hennie" Stamsnijder (born 1954), Dutch cyclo-cross and road racing cyclist
Hendricus T.C. "Henk" Stoof (born 1962), Dutch theoretical physicist
Hendrikus Jacobus "Hendrik" Tonneboeijer (1814–1837), Dutch Commander of the Dutch Gold Coast
Hendricus "Henk" Vogels (born 1942), Australian cyclist 
Hendricus J.P. "Henk" Vos (born 1968), Dutch football player and coach
Hendrikus "Henk" Vredeling (1924–2007), Minister of Defence and European Commissioner
Hendricus P.L. van Walterop (1864–1949), Dutch film actor using the pseudonym Henri de Vries
Hendricus Wessel (1887–1977), Dutch long-distance runner
Hendrikus Antonius "Henk" Zanoli (1923–2015), Dutch lawyer and World War II Resistance member

See also
Henricus

Dutch masculine given names